V. Anamika (b. 12 March 1976) is a Contemporary Artist born in Neelankarai, Chennai, Tamil Nadu, a student of S. Dhanapal, an eminent artist of India. She received her master's degree in Fine Arts (Painting and Print Making) in 1999 from Government College of Fine Arts, Chennai. She undertook a course on Care of museum objects at Government Museum in 2005. In 2006, she went to Scotland as a visiting artist scholar to learn Japanese wood-block printing at Edinburgh printmaker’s studio.

Awards

She is a recipient of The 55th National exhibition of art Lalit Kala Akademi Award  (2014)., Audi Ritz icon Award,Chennai.(2011), Charles Wallace India Trust Award (2010–11). She earned a Visiting scholarship to the UK to learn Enameling art at University of the West of England.  She has also received a Visiting Artist Award for printmaking residency(1997) at Edinburgh printmakers studio. Apart from these international accolades she has received many National and State recognitions like 6th All India Fine Arts Exhibition (1995), Karnataka Chitrakala Parishath - Karnataka, Lalit Kala Akademi Scholarship for Young Artist(2001)., All India Fine Arts and Crafts Society Collaborating with Lalit Kala Akademi (1997)., Regional Art Exhibition  Chitra Kala Samsed (1996), Machilapatnam, Andhra Pradesh., Arrikamedu Art Academy 4th South Zone Level Art Exhibition Committee, Pondicherry(1996) and the Ovia Nunkalai Kuzhu Award (1995, 1997, 1998).

Exhibitions Participated

Invited show
 2013 - ArtBengaluru, ArtChutney.com  Bangalore.
 2012 - Reginonal Art Exhibition, Lalit Kala Akademi, Chennai.
 2010 - Silver Anniversary show,  Association of British Scholars , Chennai.
 2010 - ‘The Madras Canvas’,  Forum Art Gallery  ICC Kuala Lumpur.
 2010 - "Sangamam Art Festival Confluence" (Chennai Art Initiative), Dakshinchitra, Chennai.
 2007 - She India" Noble Sage Gallery, London
 2007 - Dalating Path, a French-indo collaborative project, apparao art gallery, Chennai
 2005 - women@rt at Forum art gallery, Chennai

Solo shows

 2010 - ’, at Focus Art Gallery, Chennai
 2007 - 'Transfer’, Alliance France, Chennai
 2006 - ‘Tune in 96.6’, Alliance France, Chennai
 2005 - ‘Sum Of Infinity’, Alliance France, Chennai
 1999 - ‘Sum Of Infinity’, Lalit Kala Academi, Chennai
 1999 - Whistle Stop Cafe, Chennai
 1997 - International Airport Authority of India, Chennai

                                                                              	    
Group Shows
 2013 - Madras Musings, Veda Art Gallery, Chennai.
 2010 - Chennai revisited, The Noble Sage Art Gallery, London.
 2007 -  Sumukha Art Gallery, Chennai
 2007 - art equalated,  India habitat centre, New Delhi
 2000, 2001, 2003, 2004, 2006 - National Exhibition of Art, Lalit Kala Akademi
 1997, 1999, 2000 & 2001 - International Exhibition of Miniprints, Spain
 1997 - Ovia Nunkalai Kuzhu Young Artists Exhibition Collaborated with GCAC, Chennai
 1997 - All India Fine Arts and Crafts Society Collaborating with Lalit Kala Akademi, Chennai
 1995–2001 - Tamil Nadu Ovia Nunkalai Kuzhu Annual Exhibition of Arts, Chennai
 1997 - Zipzoom a four Man Show at Saga Art Gallery, Chennai.
 1996 - Maxmuller Bhavan, German Consulate, Chennai
 1996 - Regional Art Exhibition, Chitra Kala Samsed, Machilapatnam, Andhra Pradesh.
 1996 - Arrikamedu Art Academy 4th South Zone Level Art Exhibition Committee, Pondicherry
 1995 - 6th All India Fine Arts Exhibition, Karnataka Chitrakala Parishath – Karnataka

References

External links
Going round in circles

1975 births
Indian women contemporary artists
Indian women painters
Living people
Government College of Fine Arts, Chennai alumni
Indian multimedia artists
New media artists
Indian contemporary painters
Artists from Chennai
21st-century Indian painters
20th-century Indian women artists
21st-century Indian women artists
Women artists from Tamil Nadu
Painters from Tamil Nadu